The North Canton Community United Methodist Church is a historic church in North Canton, Connecticut. It was founded in 1871 at the intersection of Cherry Brook Road (Route 179) and Case Street on land donated by Milo Lee and Ruggles Case. The first service was held April 12, 1872. An adjacent parsonage was purchased from Milo Lee in 1875. The church is a member of the New York Annual Conference of the United Methodist Church.

The church has hosted an annual strawberry festival since 1951, though in 2020 it went on hiatus.

Cemetery
The North Canton Cemetery, originally known as North Burying Ground, is located on Route 179 (Cherry Brook Rd) in North Canton. The land was a gift from Peter Curtiss of Canton (then called West Simsbury), circa 1744, with the first burial taking place in 1756. Many of the church's members sit on the Board & are caretakers of the cemetery.  There are also a few burials in the North Canton Community UMC's Memorial Garden which is located behind the church.

References

External links
 

19th-century Methodist church buildings
United Methodist churches in Connecticut
Churches in Hartford County, Connecticut
Religious organizations established in 1871
Cemeteries in Hartford County, Connecticut
1871 establishments in Connecticut